NFL YET is a charter junior high and high school located in south Phoenix, Arizona, one of the various NFL Youth Education Towns set up across the United States. The school is operated by ESPIRITU Schools, which also operates a K-3 school and a school serving grades 4–6 on the same campus. ESPIRITU Schools was co-founded by Estela Ruiz. It is a member of both the Canyon Athletic Association and the Arizona Interscholastic Association.

High schools in Phoenix, Arizona
Public high schools in Arizona
Public middle schools in Arizona
Charter schools in Arizona